The Cricket is a 1917 American silent drama film directed by Elsie Jane Wilson and starring Gretchen Lederer, Zoe Rae and Winter Hall.

Cast
 Zoe Rae as The Cricket as a child
 Rena Rogers as The Cricket as an adult
 Fred Warren as Saveline
 Harry Holden as Caesar
 Winter Hall as Pinglet
 George Hupp as Pascal as a boy
 Hallam Cooley as Pascal as an adult 
 Gretchen Lederer as The Cricket's Mother

References

Bibliography
 Robert B. Connelly. The Silents: Silent Feature Films, 1910-36, Volume 40, Issue 2. December Press, 1998.

External links
 

1917 films
1917 drama films
1910s English-language films
American silent feature films
Silent American drama films
American black-and-white films
Universal Pictures films
Films directed by Elsie Jane Wilson
1910s American films